Mitsubishi Aircraft Company (Mitsubishi Kokuki) was the new name given by the Mitsubishi Company (Mitsubishi Shokai), in 1928, to its subsidiary, Mitsubishi Internal Combustion (Mitsubishi Nainenki), to reflect its changing role as an aircraft manufacturer catering to the growing demand for military aircraft in Japan.

History  
Mitsubishi Nainenki had been established in Nagoya in 1920, and signed a technology agreement with Junkers in 1925. By 1926, it had become one of the largest aircraft manufacturers in Japan with an output of 69 aircraft and 70 engines.

In 1932, Mitsubishi Aircraft was among the companies that involved in a consolidation process catalysed by the Imperial Japanese Navy's Aviation Arsenal. The Navy launched a three-year program to have the manufacturers develop certain types of aircraft under competition. Most important of them were the Mitsubishi A5M (96-Shiki) Carrier Fighter and Mitsubishi G3M (96-Shiki) Attack Bomber developed by Mitsubishi with engines made by Nakajima Aircraft Company.

In 1934, the company was merged with Mitsubishi Shipbuilding to become Mitsubishi Heavy Industries (Mitsubishi Jukogyo). It had a prominent role to play in the upsurge of aircraft production in Japan, which shot up from 400 in 1931, to 4,800 in 1941 and peaked at 24,000 in 1944.

Aircraft

Company designations
1MF - 1923 carrier-based biplane fighter
1MF9 - 1927 carrier-based biplane fighter prototype; lost to the Nakajima A1N
1MF10 - 1933 carrier-based monoplane fighter prototype
1MT - 1922 triplane torpedo bomber
2MB1 - 1926 biplane light bomber
2MB2 - 1925 biplane light bomber prototype
2MR - 1922 carrier-based biplane reconnaissance aircraft
2MR8 - 1932 parasol monoplane reconnaissance aircraft
3MT5 - 1932 carrier-based biplane bomber prototype
3MT10 - 1932 carrier-based attack aircraft prototype
4MS1 - prototype for K3M
Ka-8 - 1934 two-seat carrier based fighter prototype

Naval aircraft
Fighter
A5M - 'Claude' 1936 carrier-based fighter
A6M Zero - 'Zeke' 1940 long-range carrier-based fighter; most produced Japanese combat aircraft
A7M 烈風 Reppū (Strong Wind) - 'Sam' 1942 carrier-based fighter
J2M 雷電 Raiden (Lightning Bolt) - 'Jack' 1942 land-based fighter
J4M 閃電 Senden (Flashing Lightning) - 'Luke' land-based interceptor (project only)
J8M 秋水 Shūsui (Autumn Water) - rocket-powered interceptor prototype, based on the Messerschmitt Me 163

Torpedo bomber
B1M - 1924 biplane torpedo bomber
B2M - 1932 carrier-based biplane torpedo bomber, based on the Blackburn T.7B
B4M - 1934 carrier-based biplane torpedo bomber prototype; lost to the Yokosuka B4Y
B5M - 'Mabel' 1937 carrier-based torpedo bomber

Reconnaissance aircraft
C1M - later designation of 2MR
C5M - naval version of Ki-15
F1M - 'Pete' 1936 reconnaissance floatplane; last IJN biplane design

Dive bomber
D3M

Bomber
G1M - 1934 twin-engine long-range reconnaissance/attack bomber prototype
G3M - 'Nell' 1935 twin-engine medium bomber/torpedo bomber
G4M - Tozan (Eastern Mountain) 'Betty' 1940 twin-engine medium bomber
G6M - convoy fighter version of G4M
G7M 泰山 Taizan (Great Mountain) - twin-engine long-range heavy bomber (project only)

Trainer
A5M4-K - trainer version of A5M
A6M2-K - trainer version of A6M
G6M1-K - trainer version of G6M
K3M - 'Pine' 1931 single-engine biplane trainer
K6M (project only)
K7M - 1938 twin-engine monoplane trainer prototype

Transport
G6M1-L - transport version of G6M
K3M3-L - transport version of K3M
L4M - naval version of Ki-57

Patrol aircraft
Q2M Taiyō - twin-engine ASW/patrol aircraft developed from the Ki-67 (project only)

Army aircraft
Trainer
甲 1 (Ko 1) - license-built Nieuport 81 E.2
Ki-7 - army version of K3M trainer

Bomber
Ki-1 - 1933 twin-engine heavy bomber
Ki-2 - 'Louise' 1933 twin-engine light bomber, based on the Junkers K 37
Ki-20 - 1932 four-engine heavy bomber, based on the Junkers K 51
Ki-21 - 'Sally'/'Gwen' 1938 twin-engine heavy bomber
Ki-30 - 'Ann' 1938 single-engine light bomber
Ki-42 - heavy bomber (project only)
Ki-47 - light bomber (project only)
Ki-50 -  twin-engine heavy bomber (project only)
Ki-51 - 'Sonia' 1939 single-engine light bomber/dive bomber
Ki-67 飛龍 Hiryū (Flying Dragon) - 'Peggy' 1944 twin-engine medium bomber
Ki-90 - heavy bomber/transport, based on the Junkers Ju 90 (project only)

Reconnaissance aircraft
Ki-15 雁金 Karigane (Wild Goose) - 'Babs' 1937 reconnaissance/light bomber aircraft
Ki-35 - close support/reconnaissance aircraft (project only)
Ki-40 - strategic reconnaissance aircraft (project only)
Ki-46 - 'Dinah' 1941 twin-engine reconnaissance aircraft
Ki-95 - reconnaissance version of Ki-83 (project only)

Transport
Ki-57 - 'Topsy' 1942 transport aircraft developed from the Ki-21
Ki-97 - transport version of Ki-67 (project only)

Fighter
Ki-18 - 1935 single-seat monoplane fighter prototype; lost to the Kawasaki Ki-10
Ki-33 - 1936 single-seat monoplane fighter prototype; lost to the Nakajima Ki-27
Ki-39 - two-seat twin-engine heavy fighter (project only)
Ki-69 - escort fighter version of Ki-67 (project only)
Ki-73 - 'Steve' single-engine long-range escort fighter
Ki-83 - 1944 long-range heavy fighter prototype
Ki-103 - improved Ki-83 (project only)
Ki-109 - night fighter, day fighter and heavy fighter-interceptor versions of Ki-67 
Ki-112 - escort fighter with wood construction (project only)

Interceptor
Ki-99 - single-seat short-range interceptor (project only)
Ki-200 - army version of J8M

Kamikaze aircraft
Ki-167 Sakura-dan (Cherry Blossom) - kamikaze version of Ki-67

Civil aircraft
Hinazuru - license-built Airspeed Envoy
MC-1 - 1928 biplane airliner prototype based on the B1M
MS-1 - civil transport version of K3M trainer
MC-20 - civil airliner version of Ki-57 transport
Ohtori - demilitarized version of Ki-2 for long-range flights

Engines
Mitsubishi Ha-26 Shinten (震天, Progress; company designation A6(7), also known as MK1 and Ha6) - 14 cylinder, two-row radial engine
Mitsubishi Ha-31 Zuisei (瑞星, Holy Star; company designation A14, also known as MK2 and Ha26/Ha102) - supercharged 14 cylinder, two-row radial engine
Mitsubishi Ha-32 Kasei (火星, Mars; company designation A10, also known as MK4 and Ha101/Ha111) - 14 cylinder, two-row radial engine
Mitsubishi Ha-33 Kinsei (金星, Venus; company designation A8, also known as MK8 and Ha112) - 14 cylinder, two-row radial engine based on the Pratt & Whitney R-1690 Hornet
Mitsubishi Ha-42 - projected 18 cylinder version of the Kasei
Mitsubishi Ha-43 (company designation A20; also known as Ha211 and MK9) - prototype 18 cylinder, twin-row radial engine; more powerful development of the Kinsei

References

 

Defunct aircraft manufacturers of Japan
Defunct aircraft engine manufacturers of Japan
Manufacturing companies based in Nagoya
Mitsubishi companies
Manufacturing companies disestablished in 1934
Manufacturing companies established in 1928
1928 establishments in Japan
1934 disestablishments in Japan
1934 mergers and acquisitions